Vladimir Aleksandrovich Orlov (born December 2, 1938) is a Russian speed skater who competed for the Soviet Union in the 1964 Winter Olympics.

He was born in Moscow. In 1964 he won the silver medal in the 500 meters event.

External links
 profile

1938 births
Living people
Soviet male speed skaters
Olympic speed skaters of the Soviet Union
Speed skaters at the 1964 Winter Olympics
Olympic silver medalists for the Soviet Union
Olympic medalists in speed skating
Medalists at the 1964 Winter Olympics